The Elgin–Franklin fields are two adjacent gas condensate fields located in the Central Graben Area of the North Sea  east of Aberdeen, Scotland at a water depth of . The joint development of the Elgin and Franklin fields is the largest high pressure high temperature development in the world, and also contains the world's hottest, highest temperature field, West Franklin, and the Glenelg field. On 25 March 2012, a gas leak occurred at the Elgin platform resulting in a shut down of production and evacuation of personnel. The leak continued for over seven weeks, and was stopped after well intervention work on 16 May 2012. Production from the fields restarted almost a year later, on 9 March 2013.

History
The Franklin field was discovered by well 29/5b-4, drilled by Ultramar in 1985, and appraised by wells 29/5b-6z in 1989/1990 and 29/5b-8 in 1991. The field was named after British Explorer Sir John Franklin, and first production was in August 2001.

The Elgin field was discovered by well 22/30c-8 in 1991 and appraised by wells 22/30c-10 in 1992/1993 and 22/30c-13 in 1994, drilled by Elf Aquitaine. The field was named after the Scottish town of Elgin. It is also named as a tribute to a geologist named Nigel who was instrumental in the field's discovery, Elgin is an anagram of Nigel. Production from the Elgin field began in March 2001.

The Glenelg satellite field was discovered in 1999 by well 29/4d-4, drilled by Total. It is named after the Scottish town of Glenelg, Highland. It was developed by a step-out well drilled from the Elgin platform and first production was in March 2006.

The West Franklin reservoir was discovered by Total in 2003. It was developed by a deviated well from the Franklin platform. First production was achieved in March 2007 with the second well coming on stream in September 2008. A new wellhead platform was installed on West Franklin in 2014 with three wells being drilled as of 2016. Production from the first well (29/5b-H1Z) started in 2015. A second wellhead platform Elgin B has also been installed at Elgin and is bridge linked to the Elgin A platform and PUQ to enable extra infill production wells to be drilled.

March 2012 gas leak
On 25 March 2012 a gas leak occurred at the Elgin Well head platform within well 22/30c-G4 during operations to plug and decommission the well.  No injuries were reported and 219 non-essential personnel were evacuated from the PUQ and the adjacent Rowan Viking jack up drilling rig, which was performing the decommissioning work. The remaining 19 personnel were evacuated later on the same day.

At the time of the incident the fields were producing  of oil equivalent, about 7% of the UK's gas production. The HM Coastguard declared a  exclusion zone for ships and a  exclusion zone for aircraft. Shell E&P also evacuated non essential staff from the separate Shearwater platform located in block 22/30b  from Elgin. At its peak,  of gas was being released, which slowed when a relief well was drilled. The platform flare was alight till 31 March 2012 representing a potential risk of ignition for the leaking gas if wind direction should change. Total announced the flare spontaneously shut down on Saturday 31 March 2012 after exhaustion of the volatile residues within the PUQ processing facilities which it was burning. The leak was stopped following well intervention work on 16 May 2012, which involved pumping mud and cement into the well.

The cause of the incident was identified as corrosion in the casing of the G4 well, and a sudden release of gas from the Hod formation above the producing reservoir. The Hod formation had been isolated by steel casing during drilling in 1997. On 25 February 2012 an increase in pressure was observed in the C annulus within the well and remedial operations started on 4 March 2012. Total believe that the C annulus failed and gas was observed leaking from the  conductor.

An inspection team comprising eight people from Total and Wild Well Control, a specialist well control company, boarded the Elgin platform on 5 April 2012 to gather information about the state of the platform. The team left safely after four hours.

During April 2012 a diverter assembly was installed around the G4 well head to divert the leaking gas (estimated then at ) away from the platform in a controlled manner enabling well control operations to begin. In May 2012 two drilling rigs were working on repairing the leak. The West Phoenix semi submersible rig was working on the "top kill" operation. This involved pumping weighted drilling mud into the well via the wellhead assembly, a method which was ultimately successful in halting the leak. A relief well, G4-K1 was drilled to "bottom kill" the well by the Sedco 714.

Eleven monitoring overflights of the area by surveillance aircraft from Oil Spill Response Limited were made in early May, and the flow rate from the well was estimated at that time to be .

On 16 May Total announced that the leak had been stopped.

Production restarted on 9 March 2013.

December 2016 Helicopter Incident

On 28 December 2016 a Sikorsky S-92 helicopter (registration G-WNSR, serial number 920250) operated by CHC Helicopter experienced "unexpected control responses" whilst in mid-air on a routine shuttle flight between two oil installations in the North Sea. The pilots conducted an emergency landing on the West Franklin platform. The helicopter is reported to have spun on the helideck during the landing, damaging the helicopter wheels and rotor blades. The helideck also sustained damage during the emergency landing. There were no reported injuries amongst the nine passengers and two crew during the incident. The aircraft was transported back to Aberdeen via ship, at which time the Air Accidents Investigation Branch began their investigation into the incident. Sikorsky issued a notice on 9 January 2017 grounding all S-92 aircraft until the tail rotors have been inspected. The inspection work takes approximately 11 man hours to complete. The Air Accidents Investigation Branch issued an update on 11 January 2017 which reported that the tail rotor pitch change shaft bearing had seized. The bearing showed signs of severe overheating and significant wear. The failure of the bearing allowed the tail rotor driveshaft to damage the tail rotor servo. The damage to the tail rotor servo is considered to be the cause of tail rotor control. The health and usage monitoring systems had discovered the flaw the day before flight, but the maintenance crew had not.

Ownership
The fields are operated by Total E&P UK Limited, a subsidiary of Total S.A.(formerly Elf Aquitaine).

Elgin-Franklin and West Franklin

Equity in Elgin and Franklin was fixed by a unitisation agreement between three partner groups, and is shown in the table below. West Franklin is owned by the same partnership.

Glenelg

The partners in the Glenelg field are shown below.

Geology

Franklin field

The Franklin field is a tilted fault block with little internal faulting. The main reservoir is the Upper Jurassic (Oxfordian Age) Fulmar Sandstone which has porosities in excess of 20%. The Middle Jurassic Pentland formation forms a second reservoir with a separate hydrocarbon pool. The reservoir is at  depth.

Elgin field
 
The Elgin structure is a fault bounded high on top of a collapsed Triassic mud "pod". It is heavily faulted and split into several separate fault panels with discrete gas water contacts. The reservoir is the same Fulmar sandstone as Franklin. The Pentland reservoir at Elgin is of poorer quality than that underneath Franklin and has not been developed.

West Franklin
The West Franklin structure has a Fulmar formation reservoir.

Glenelg
The Glenelg field is a tilted fault block with a Fulmar formation reservoir.

Development

The installation consists of three separate platforms, two of which are connected by a  bridge: two wellhead platforms which house the wells, one each for the Elgin and Franklin reservoirs, and the process, utilities and quarters (PUQ) platform, which is the central processing platform. The PUQ is a pile mounted jack up design which contains hydrocarbon processing facilities, control systems and accommodation for the crew of 97. The structure was built by BARMAC in Nigg, Scotland, and installed in July 2000.
 
The Franklin wellhead platform (WHP) has nine well slots (seven wells on the Franklin Field and two extended reach wells on West Franklin) . It is not normally manned but has a helideck and shelter for up to 20 people. The Elgin wellhead platform has 12 well slots (11 wells on Elgin and one extended reach well on Glenelg). The platforms are linked to the PUQ by flowlines and were installed in 1999. The WHP has no installed drilling facilities (derrick, etc.). Well drilling and workover services are provided when needed by a jack up rig which operates in tender mode.

The west Franklin and Elgin B platforms were installed in 2014 in order to enable drilling of further development wells in the fields due to constraints in the existing facilities. In 2017 there were three wells on West Franklin and three wells on Elgin B)

The Produced oil is transported through the Forties pipeline system to BP's Kinneil terminal in Grangemouth  while produced gas is transported through the SEAL Pipeline to Bacton, Norfolk.

Reservoir characteristics
 high pressure / high temperature (HP/HT) wells
 well depth: 
 pressure range: 600 – 1100 bar
 operational pressure: 860 bar
 fluid temperature: 
 sea floor depth: 

See also
 Energy in the United Kingdom
 Piper Alpha (1988)
 Deepwater Horizon oil spill (2010)
 Sour gas

References

External links
 

 
 
 
 
 

North Sea energy
Oil fields of Scotland
TotalEnergies
ExxonMobil oil and gas fields
Eni